The Abilene Christian Wildcats women's basketball team represents Abilene Christian University (ACU) in Abilene, Texas. ACU joined the Western Athletic Conference on July 1, 2021, after eight seasons in the Southland Conference. The Wildcats are currently coached by Julie Goodenough.

Postseason

NCAA Division I Tournament results

NCAA Division II tournament results
The Wildcats made eleven appearances in the NCAA Division II women's basketball tournament. They had a combined record of 9–11.

AIAW College Division/Division II
The Wildcats made one appearance in the AIAW National Division II basketball tournament, with a combined record of 1–1.

Roster
Sources:

References

External links